SAEREO (legally Servicios Aéreos Ejecutivos Saereo S.A.) was a regional airline based in Quito, Ecuador. It operates charter and domestic passenger services, as well as medivac flights.

Destinations
SAEREO operated services to the following:

Guayaquil - José Joaquín de Olmedo International Airport
Loja - Ciudad de Catamayo Airport
Macas - Edmundo Carvajal Airport
Quito - Old Mariscal Sucre International Airport Hub

Piura - PAF Captain Guillermo Concha Iberico International Airport

Fleet

The SAEREO fleet included the following aircraft in August 2006:

1 Embraer EMB-120ER Brasilia
1 Embraer EMB-120RT Brasilia
1 Beechcraft 1900C
1 Beechcraft 1900D

See also
List of defunct airlines of Ecuador

References

External links

SAEREO

Airlines established in 1994
Airlines disestablished in 2012
Defunct airlines of Ecuador
1994 establishments in Ecuador
2010s disestablishments in Ecuador